Sainte-Colombe-sur-Loing (literally Sainte-Colombe on Loing) is a former commune in the Yonne department in Bourgogne-Franche-Comté in north-central France. On 1 January 2019, it was merged into the new commune Treigny-Perreuse-Sainte-Colombe.

See also
Communes of the Yonne department

References

Former communes of Yonne